In thermal quantum field theory, the Matsubara frequency summation (named after Takeo Matsubara) is the summation over discrete imaginary frequencies. It takes the following form

where  is the inverse temperature and the frequencies  are usually taken from either of the following two sets (with ):
bosonic frequencies: 
fermionic frequencies: 

In addition to thermal quantum field theory, the Matsubara frequency summation method also plays an essential role in the diagrammatic approach to solid-state physics, namely, if one  considers the diagrams at finite temperature.

Summation formalism

General formalism 

The weighting functions in the boson case η = +1 and fermion case η = −1 differ. The choice of weighting function will be discussed later. With the weighting function, the summation can be replaced by a contour integral surrounding the imaginary axis.

As in Fig. 1, the weighting function generates poles (red crosses) on the imaginary axis. The contour integral picks up the residue of these poles, which is equivalent to the summation. This procedure is sometimes called Sommerfeld-Watson transformation.

By deformation of the contour lines to enclose the poles of g(z) (the green cross in Fig. 2), the summation can be formally accomplished by summing the residue of g(z)hη(z) over all poles of g(z),

Note that a minus sign is produced, because the contour is deformed to enclose the poles in the clockwise direction, resulting in the negative residue.

Choice of Matsubara weighting function 
To produce simple poles on boson frequencies , either of the following two types of Matsubara weighting functions can be chosen

depending on which half plane the convergence is to be controlled in.  controls the convergence in the left half plane (Re z < 0), while  controls the convergence in the right half plane (Re z > 0). Here  is the Bose–Einstein distribution function.

The case is similar for fermion frequencies. There are also two types of Matsubara weighting functions that produce simple poles at 

 controls the convergence in the left half plane (Re z < 0), while  controls the convergence in the right half plane (Re z > 0). Here  is the Fermi–Dirac distribution function.

In the application to Green's function calculation, g(z) always have the structure

which diverges in the left half plane given 0 < τ < β. So as to control the convergence, the weighting function of the first type is always chosen . However, there is no need to control the convergence if the Matsubara summation does not diverge, in that case, any choice of the Matsubara weighting function will lead to identical results.

Table of Matsubara frequency summations 
The following table contains 
for some simple rational functions g(z). The symbol η = ±1 is the statistical sign.

[1] Since the summation does not converge, the result may differ upon different choice of the Matsubara weighting function.

[2] (1 ↔ 2) denotes the same expression as the before but with index 1 and 2 interchanged.

Applications in physics

Zero temperature limit 
In this limit , the Matsubara frequency summation is equivalent to the integration of imaginary frequency over imaginary axis.

Some of the integrals do not converge. For example, the free energy is obtained by the integral of logarithm,

meaning that at zero temperature, the free energy simply relates to the internal energy below the chemical potential. Also the distribution function is obtained by the following integral

which shows step function behavior at zero temperature.

Green's function related

Time domain 
Consider a function G(τ) defined on the imaginary time interval (0,β). It can be given in terms of Fourier series,

 

where the frequency only takes discrete values spaced by 2/β.

The particular choice of frequency depends on the boundary condition of the function G(τ). In physics, G(τ) stands for the imaginary time representation of Green's function

 

It satisfies the periodic boundary condition G(τ+β)=G(τ) for a boson field. While for a fermion field the boundary condition is anti-periodic G(τ + β) = −G(τ).

Given the Green's function G(iω) in the frequency domain, its imaginary time representation G(τ) can be evaluated by Matsubara frequency summation. Depending on the boson or fermion frequencies that is to be summed over, the resulting G(τ) can be different. To distinguish, define

with

Note that τ is restricted in the principal interval (0,β). The boundary condition can be used to extend G(τ) out of the principal interval. Some frequently used results are concluded in the following table.

Operator switching effect 
The small imaginary time plays a critical role here. The order of the operators will change if the small imaginary time changes sign.

Distribution function 
The evaluation of distribution function becomes tricky because of the discontinuity of Green's function G(τ) at τ = 0. To evaluate the summation

both choices of the weighting function are acceptable, but the results are different.

Bosons

Fermions

Free energy 
Bosons

Fermions

Diagram evaluations 
Frequently encountered diagrams are evaluated here with the single mode setting. Multiple mode problems can be approached by a spectral function integral.

Fermion self energy

Particle-hole bubble

Particle-particle bubble

Appendix: Properties of distribution functions

Distribution functions 
The general notation  stands for either Bose (η = +1) or Fermi (η = −1) distribution function

If necessary, the specific notations nB and nF are used to indicate Bose and Fermi distribution functions respectively

Relation to hyperbolic functions 
The Bose distribution function is related to hyperbolic cotangent function by

The Fermi distribution function is related to hyperbolic tangent function by

Parity 
Both distribution functions do not have definite parity,

Another formula is in terms of the  function

However their derivatives have definite parity.

Bose–Fermi transmutation 
Bose and Fermi distribution functions transmute under a shift of the variable by the fermionic frequency,

However shifting by bosonic frequencies does not make any difference.

Derivatives

First order 

In terms of product:

In the zero temperature limit:

Second order

Formula of difference

Case a = 0

Case a → 0

Case b → 0

The function cη 
Definition:

For Bose and Fermi type:

Relation to hyperbolic functions 

It is obvious that  is positive definite.

To avoid overflow in the numerical calculation, the tanh and coth functions are used

Case a = 0

Case b = 0

Low temperature limit 

For a = 0: 

For b = 0: 

In general,

See also 
 Imaginary time
 Thermal quantum field theory

External links
Agustin Nieto: Evaluating Sums over the Matsubara Frequencies. arXiv:hep-ph/9311210
Github repository: MatsubaraSum A Mathematica package for Matsubara frequency summation.
A. Taheridehkordi, S. Curnoe, J.P.F. LeBlanc: Algorithmic Matsubara Integration for Hubbard-like models.. arXiv:cond-mat/1808.05188

References

Quantum field theory